"Hello" is the third & final single from Ice Cube's sixth studio album War & Peace Vol. 2 (The Peace Disc). The song is an N.W.A reunion with his former groupmates Dr. Dre and MC Ren.

The song can be found as a bonus track, along with "Chin Check", on the N.W.A Greatest Hits album, and appeared on Ice Cube's Greatest Hits compilation album in 2001. It also mentions the rapper Eazy-E and the record company that he used, Ruthless Records. The chorus features a line taken from Dr. Dre's track "The Watcher", released on the album 2001.

Charts

Music video
The music video has similar scenes to the N.W.A's music video of "Alwayz into Somethin'".

References

2000 singles
Ice Cube songs
MC Ren songs
Dr. Dre songs
N.W.A songs
Songs written by Ice Cube
Songs written by MC Ren
Songs written by Dr. Dre
Songs written by Eminem
Songs written by Snoop Dogg
Song recordings produced by Dr. Dre
Gangsta rap songs
2000 songs
G-funk songs